Valérie Bonneton (born 5 April 1970) is a French stage, film and television actress.

Life and career

Valérie Bonneton was born in Somain, Nord department. Her father was an insurance salesman and her mother a housewife. She grew up in neighbouring Aniche and fell in love with acting in her cinquième (~Year 7) French class. Considering an acting career too difficult, she entered the science stream for her baccalauréat, intending to become a veterinarian. But playing the role of Ismène in Anouilh’s Antigone changed her mind. After her baccalauréat she left for Paris where she enrolled at Cours Florent, supporting herself with part-time jobs (fruit seller, baby-sitter, sculptor’s model). In 1991 she was accepted into the National Academy of Dramatic Arts where she studied until the age of 26.

She took noteworthy supporting roles in films, until the success of the television series Fais pas ci, fais pas ça in 2007, which made her popular. In 2010, she appeared in Guillaume Canet’s Little White Lies which earnt her a César Awards nomination as Best Supporting Actress. In 2013, she appeared in Eyjafjallajökull with Dany Boon. In 2017, she acted in Garde alternée with Didier Bourdon and Isabelle Carré.

Filmography

Feature films

Television

Awards and nominations

Molière Award

César Award

Golden Nymph Award

Decorations
Chevalier of the Order of Arts and Letters (2016)

References

External links

1970 births
Living people
French film actresses
French television actresses
People from Somain, Nord
21st-century French actresses
20th-century French actresses
French National Academy of Dramatic Arts alumni
Cours Florent alumni
Chevaliers of the Ordre des Arts et des Lettres